Chris Regan is an American comedy writer. From 1999 to 2006, Regan was a writer on The Daily Show with Jon Stewart, where he won five Emmy awards, two Peabody Awards, and was nominated for a Writers Guild of America award. He has also written for Talkshow with Spike Feresten, The Burn with Jeff Ross, Lopez Tonight, The Jeselnik Offensive and  Family Guy.

Regan was a co-author of the best-selling America (The Book), has written comedy pilots for 20th Century Fox, Comedy Central and in 2011 developed a pilot with The Jim Henson Company and Bunim/Murray Productions. His work has also appeared in New York magazine and USA Today.

His book, Mass Historia: 365 Days of Historical Facts and (Mostly) Fictions, was published by Andrews McMeel in Fall 2008, and he was the co-author of the humor book/memoir Shatner Rules with William Shatner.

In 2017, Regan portrayed game show host Monty Hall in the Showtime comedy/drama series "I'm Dying Up Here."

Regan was born in the Bronx, raised in Ulster County and graduated from New Paltz High School. He has a degree from Ithaca College. He resides in Los Angeles.

References

External links
 
 Chris Regan on Amazon

Year of birth missing (living people)
Living people
Ithaca College alumni
American comedy writers
People from the Bronx